Legacy Five is a Southern gospel quartet founded by former Cathedral Quartet members Roger Bennett and Scott Fowler in 1999, after the owners of the Cathedral Quartet, Glen Payne and George Younce, decided to retire in 1999.

History
Legacy Five's very first lineup consisted of tenor Josh Cobb, lead Scott Fowler, baritone Scott Howard, bass Glenn Dustin, and pianist Roger Bennett, who supplied a fifth vocal part in some songs.

The group enjoyed great success with their first album release, Strong In The Strength. The group's first Top 10 hit, "I Stand Redeemed", featured young tenor Josh Cobb. He won the Horizon Individual Award at the 2000 National Quartet Convention, and resigned from the group two days later, saying he felt he wasn't really part of the group. Cobb was replaced by Tony Jarman, who stayed with the group until 2004.

Frank Seamans, who sang with Scott Fowler in the 1990s in a group called The Sound, replaced Tony and stayed with the group from 2004 to 2009. In 2005, he won the Horizon Individual Award.

Tim Parton, a pianist who produced a number of the group's albums, joined the group on the road in October 2006 as a substitute for the ill Bennett. Following Bennett's death on March 17, 2007, from complications related to leukemia, Parton's "interim" tag was removed, as the group officially named him the regular pianist.

In September 2009, Frank Seamans announced his departure from Legacy Five due to his son's health issues. In October, his replacement, Gus Gaches, who previously sang with The LeFevre Quartet, was announced.

In 2011, pianist Tim Parton left, and was replaced by Trey Ivey.

On July 12, 2012, bass singer Glenn Dustin resigned, and was replaced by Matt Fouch from Soul'd Out Quartet.

In November 2015, Gus Gaches announced his departure due to several allergies and vocal fatigue. On October 8, Josh Feemster, formerly of Mercy's Mark, was named the new tenor for Legacy Five and started singing in December 2015.

On April 21, 2017, pianist Trey Ivey announced his departure from Legacy Five to spend more time with his family and focus on his studio. On June 17, 2017, Josh Townsend, from the Lefevre Quartet, announced on his personal Facebook profile he had been chosen to be Ivey's replacement.

On March 11, 2019, tenor Josh Feemster announced his resignation to work from home. Two weeks later, on March 25, baritone Scott Howard also announced his resignation to work at Danley Sound Labs, assisting and developing clients with audio needs. On April 22, 2019, it was announced that Bryan Walker, former member of the Perrys, would be taking over the baritone position. Also, songwriter Lee Black would join the group as the tenor singer.

On May 24, 2021, Josh Townsend announced he would leave his position as the group's piano player to focus on producing his own music. His replacement, Garrett Anderson, was announced on Legacy Five's Facebook page on August 2. On March 4, 2023, Anderson announced his departure from the group after accepting a position with Dailey & Vincent.

Performances
They have performed with the Gaither Homecoming Friends as well as being a regular feature at the National Quartet Convention.

They have been nominated over 70 Singing News Fan Awards, including Best Traditional Male Quartet in 2004, and have won or been nominated for an award nearly every year. At the 2004 Fan Awards, the group won in the categories of Traditional Quartet, Baritone, Bass and Pianist. At the 2005 Fan Awards, Frank Seamans won the Horizon Individual Award. At the 2007 Fan Awards, Roger Bennett was posthumously awarded Favorite Musician Award. He had won it 15 times in a row, and is the holder of the record for most consecutive such awards to date. Glenn Dustin also won Favorite Bass, and the group's Live In Music City album won Album of the Year. At the 2008 Fan Awards, the group won the Best Traditional Male Quartet Award one more time. At the 2010 Fan Awards, the Jubilee! project, by Legacy Five, Greater Vision and The Booth Brothers, won the Album of the Year Award. The group has also been nominated for a few GMA Dove Awards, and their Pure Love project was awarded Southern Gospel Album of the Year on the 2020 Dove Awards.

One of their best-known songs, "Heroes of the Faith", was composed by Roger Bennett in honor of Glen Payne. "Hello After Goodbye", from their God's Been Good project, was recorded in honor of Roger Bennett.

Members

Line-ups

Timeline

Musicians

 Piano
 Roger Bennett (2000-2007)
 Tim Parton (2007-2011)
 Trey Ivey (2011-2017)
 Josh Townsend (2017-2021)
Garrett Anderson (2021–present)
 Bass guitar
 Scott Fowler (2000-2005)
 Jordan Bennett (2005-2007)

Cathedrals Family Reunion members line-ups

Discography

Charting songs (Top 80 Southern Gospel)
#1 charting songs are shown in bold.

References

External links 
 

American Christian musical groups
Gospel quartets
Southern gospel performers
Musical groups established in 2000
Musical groups from Tennessee